Arsenate reductase may refer to:

 Arsenate reductase (azurin)
 Arsenate reductase (cytochrome c)
 Arsenate reductase (donor) 
 Arsenate reductase (glutaredoxin)